"I Just Came to Dance" is a song written by Ken Bell, Terry Skinner and J. L. Wallace, and recorded by American country music artists David Frizzell and Shelly West.  It was released in July 1982 as the second single from the album The David Frizzell & Shelly West Album.  The song reached #4 on the Billboard Hot Country Singles & Tracks chart.

In 1983, the song was covered by Roberta Flack and Peabo Bryson for their duets album, Born to Love.  Released in 1984 as the album's third single, it hit #15 on Billboard's Adult Contemporary chart.

Chart performance

References

Songs about dancing
1982 singles
1984 singles
David Frizzell songs
Shelly West songs
Roberta Flack songs
Peabo Bryson songs
Warner Records singles
Songs written by Terry Skinner
Songs written by Ken Bell (songwriter)
Songs written by J. L. Wallace
Song recordings produced by Snuff Garrett
1982 songs